Senator Cutler may refer to:

Augustus W. Cutler (1827–1897), New Jersey State Senate
Ephraim Cutler (1767–1853), Ohio State Senate
Joni Cutler (born 1956), South Dakota State Senate
Leslie Bradley Cutler (1890–1971), Massachusetts State Senate
Lysander Cutler (1807–1866), Maine State Senate
Nathan Cutler (1775–1861), Maine State Senate